Alexander Sharov may refer to:

Aleksandr Sharov (footballer) (born 1981), Russian footballer
Alexander Sharov (ice hockey) (born 1995),  Russian ice hockey player
Aleksandr Grigorevich Sharov, Russian palaeoentomologist and paleontologist